Aleksandr Artemyev (born 5 September 1966) is a Russian former boxer. He competed in the men's bantamweight event at the 1988 Summer Olympics.

References

External links
 

1966 births
Living people
Soviet male boxers
Russian male boxers
Olympic boxers of the Soviet Union
Boxers at the 1988 Summer Olympics
Sportspeople from Saint Petersburg
Bantamweight boxers